The Verizon Ladies First Tour was a co-headlining concert tour by American recording artists Beyoncé, Alicia Keys and Missy Elliott. Canadian artist Tamia was featured as a special guest. The tour, dubbed the "urban Lilith Fair" supported Elliott's fifth studio album, This Is Not a Test!; Keys' second studio album, The Diary of Alicia Keys and Beyoncé's first studio album, Dangerously in Love. The trek visited the United States performing in over twenty cities in March and April. The outing was the first three-act show to feature three to four female R&B artists in a headlining role. It became one of the biggest tours in 2004, placing 34th on Pollstar's "Top Tours of 2004"—earning over 22 million dollars. The success of the tour promoted a 2005 leg but the plans were scrapped and Verzion focused on creating the Verizon VIP Tour.

Background
The tour was originally supposed to feature Beyoncé with Ashanti, Monica, Mýa and Mary J. Blige but scheduling conflicts caused the other four ladies not to be up for the tour. When the tour was officially announced, it was Beyoncé, along with Keys, Elliott, and Tamia joining the bill. The tour was announced by various media outlets in January 2004. Conceived by Verizon Communications, the tour was sponsored by Steve Madden and L'Oréal. Hayman Entertainment and Clear Channel Entertainment served as tour promoters. Costumes were designed by Dolce & Gabbana. When the tour was announced, Beyoncé dispelled any conflict while touring. She says all three acts are good friends and there will be no competitiveness. All three acts expressed their interest in performing in a tour of this nature. It became the first tour highlighting women in the urban music scene. Beyoncé stated:"Even before I started putting my album together last year, I wanted to get together a tour with other women. I know that you have a lot of types of tours with other types of artists, but not just strictly hip-hop and R&B women".

Critical reception
The tour was lauded by critics and spectators. Although most reviews praised the ensemble, many felt Keys and Beyoncé were the stars of the show. Neil Drumming of Entertainment Weekly thought Keys was the most "radiant" performer of the evening at the Office Depot Center. He felt, "Her old-school references charmed, and her clap-along 'How Come You Don't Call Me' obliterated the CD version. Mounting the piano, tickling keys with one hand, she struck a quirky balance between class and kitsch". Jon Parles from The New York Times wrote all the ladies "earned their due" during the concert at the Nassau Veterans Memorial Coliseum. He continued, "The three headliners have made their way in a hip-hop culture that largely treats women as playthings and conquests. Their response has been to play along while making modest demands of their own. In the meantime, they're willing to work like superwomen".

Unlike the previous reviews, Steve Hammer of the newspaper NUVO was not impressed with the show at the Conseco Fieldhouse. He states the show felt "inconsequential". He further explained, "Any show featuring three multiplatinum recording artists is bound to struggle against time limitations. But the problems plaguing each of the three fine artists — Missy Elliott, Alicia Keys and Beyoncé — was not that the sets were so short, but that they were so meaningless".

High praised continued as the act performed at the MCI Center in Washington, D.C. Portsia Smith of The Free Lance–Star says the show was a night of "talent" and "beauty". She spoke highly of all the acts but says Keys was the most in-demand for the audience. She elaborates, "She wowed the audience members, who probably thought she would just sit at her piano and sang. But how wrong were they". Keys received another positive review from Stephen Kiehl from The Baltimore Sun who states, "But the most astute set closer belonged to Keys, who sang 'You Don't Know My Name' from her new album. The song features a one-sided cell phone conversation between a coffee shop waitress and the guy she has a crush on. She asks him out, but then loses the signal".

Ben Johnson of the newspaper The Day wrote the show at the Hartford Civic Center was nothing short of "decadence". He continues, "[...] became a rallying point of girl power fit for an appearance by the Powerpuff Girls". The highlight of the tour was the concert at Madison Square Garden. The show feature guest appearances from Big Boi, Fabolous, Jay-Z, Kelly Rowland and Michelle Williams. Stephen Reid of MTV News felt that throughout the entire show, Beyoncé was the star. He says, "If Muhammad Ali had been at Madison Square Garden Monday night, no doubt he would've found something to pound like a drum as he yelled, 'The champ is here! The champ is here!' That's exactly the aura Beyoncé gave off as she began her closing set of the Verizon Ladies First Tour, which also features Alicia Keys, Missy Elliott and Tamia". Reid also gave rave reviews for Keys' section of the show. "Fittingly, she started with 'Heartburn', shaking her body like Ike-era Tina Turner, causing a sudden rise in blood pressure among the men in the audience. The sex appeal was being poured all over Madison Square like milk on Cheerios".

Jennifer Wood of East Valley Tribune enjoyed the show at the America West Arena. She says, "From the moment Elliott appeared on stage wearing a black suit covered in rhinestones to Beyoncé's exit nearly four hours later, the audience rarely sat as it ogled three of the most celebrated female talents in hip-hop and R&B". San Francisco Chronicles Neva Chonin says the concert at The Arena in Oakland proved why Beyoncé is a star. She says, "In a time of assembly-line pop icons, she manages to infuse her packaged performance with charisma and genuine talent. Her vocal workouts on ballads like 'Dangerously in Love 2' clambered smoothly up and down the scales".

Setlist

{{hidden
| headercss = background: #ccccff; font-size: 100%; width: 57%;
| contentcss = text-align: left; font-size: 100%; width: 75%;
| header = Missy Elliott
| content =
"Let Me Fix My Weave"
"I'm Really Hot"
"Get Ur Freak On"
"Pass That Dutch"
"Work It"
"One Minute Man"
"Hot Boyz"
 "Hit Em wit da Hee"
 "Beep Me 911"
 "Sock It 2 Me"
Encore
 "The Rain (Supa Dupa Fly)"
}}
{{hidden
| headercss = background: #ccccff; font-size: 100%; width: 57%;
| contentcss = text-align: left; font-size: 100%; width: 75%;
| header = Alicia Keys
| content =
"Karma"
"Heartburn"
"A Woman's Worth" 
"How Come U Don't Call Me Anymore?"
"Butterflyz"
"Goodbye"
"Never Can Say Goodbye"
"Night And Day"
"If I Ain't Got You"
"So Simple"	
"Slow Down" / "Coming Home to You"
"Diary"
"Fallin'"
Encore
 "You Don't Know My Name"
}}

Shows

Notes

References

Alicia Keys concert tours
Beyoncé concert tours
Verizon Communications
2004 concert tours
Co-headlining concert tours